Martín Barragán Negrete (born 14 July 1991), also known as Poteyo, is a Mexican professional footballer who plays as a forward for Liga MX club Puebla.

International career
Barragán was named in Mexico's senior squad for 2018 FIFA World Cup qualifiers against El Salvador and Honduras in September 2016. He was included in the final 23-man roster for the 2017 CONCACAF Gold Cup.

Career statistics

International

Honours
Necaxa
Copa MX: Clausura 2018
Supercopa MX: 2018

References

External links

Martin Barragan at Atlas FC

1991 births
Living people
Mexico international footballers
Association football forwards
2017 CONCACAF Gold Cup players
Atlas F.C. footballers
Atlético Morelia players
Club Necaxa footballers
Club Universidad Nacional footballers
Liga MX players
Liga Premier de México players
Tercera División de México players
Footballers from Jalisco
Mexican footballers